Patrice Maurel (born 16 October 1978) is a French former football midfielder.

Career
Born in Cayenne, Maurel played professional football for Toulouse FC, FC Rouen, FC Istres and FC Gueugnon. He finished his career playing amateur football with US Colomiers Football and Montauban FCTG.

After winning the 1997 UEFA European Under-18 Championship with France, Maurel never managed to break into Toulouse's first team, and went on loan to Ipswich Town F.C. at age 21.

After he retired from playing, Maurel became a manager, leading US Colomiers Football.

References

External links 

1978 births
Living people
Sportspeople from Cayenne
French Guianan footballers
French footballers
France youth international footballers
Toulouse FC players
Ipswich Town F.C. players
FC Rouen players
FC Istres players
FC Gueugnon players
US Colomiers Football players
Association football midfielders
Montauban FCTG players